The rufous-crowned greenlet (Hylophilus poicilotis) is a species of bird in the family Vireonidae, the vireos. It is found in Argentina, Bolivia, Brazil and Paraguay; also southern regions of the Pantanal surrounding the Paraguay River.

Its natural habitats are subtropical or tropical moist lowland forest, subtropical or tropical moist montane forest, and heavily degraded former forest.

References

External links
Rufous-crowned Greenlet photo gallery VIREO Photo-High Res--(Close-up)
Thumbnail picture and Article (click on thumbnail)

rufous-crowned greenlet
Birds of the Atlantic Forest
Birds of the Selva Misionera
Birds of the South Region
Birds of the Pantanal
rufous-crowned greenlet
Taxonomy articles created by Polbot